Alastair Fisher was a Scottish rugby union player.

He also played for Waterloo R.F.C.

He was the father of Colin Fisher, who was also capped for Scotland.

References
 Bath, Richard (ed.) The Scotland Rugby Miscellany (Vision Sports Publishing Ltd, 2007 )

Lancashire County RFU players
Scotland international rugby union players
Scottish rugby union players
Waterloo R.F.C. players